Oceanobacter is a bacteria genus from the family of Oceanospirillaceae with one known species (Oceanobacter kriegii).

References

Oceanospirillales
Monotypic bacteria genera
Bacteria genera